Gullivers People were a London-based pop group that had some radio success and were produced and recorded by Norman 'Hurricane' Smith at Abbey Road Studios in London.

References

English pop music groups
Musical groups from London